Sille may refer to:

People 
 Sille (given name), a Scandinavian feminine given name
 Les Sille (1928–2007), English footballer
 Müzahir Sille (1931–2016), Turkish Olympic wrestler
 Timotej Šille (born 1995), Slovak ice hockey player

Places 
Belgium
 Sille (Belgium), a watercourse running through Silly, Belgium

France
 Sillé-le-Guillaume, a commune in the Sarthe department
 Sillé-le-Philippe, a commune in the Sarthe department

Turkey
 Sille, Konya, a village
 Sille Dam